The SEAT 133 is a small rear-engined car designed and sold by SEAT in Spain from 1974 until 1979. The car used the chassis and engine of the by then defunct Fiat/SEAT 850 and featured a new body in the style of the contemporary, somewhat smaller and only indirectly related Fiat 126.

History 
The car was first exhibited at the Barcelona Motor Show in May 1974. It was developed by SEAT, with which Italian company Fiat had signed an agreement of collaboration in the 1950s.

The 133's design premise was that it had to be a cheap car both to develop and build. Thus, the final product inherited most of its components from the SEAT 850 (or very closely related Fiat 850).

The 133 effectively replaced the SEAT 850 and the SEAT 600 both of which had been produced in considerable numbers with around 800,000 of the more venerable 600 built – almost exclusively for the domestic market - by 1974.

Initially the 133 was only sold in Spain and did not enjoy great success, since it suffered from frequent overheating problems. It was intended to replace the old 600 and 850 models, and was also meant to provide a means for SEAT to open new markets and make up for the loss of sales in Spain that would come with the disappearance of the restrictions in car imports during the 1970s. Export rates were higher than for the 133's predecessors (as well as the remainder of the SEAT range), reaching 36.7 percent in 1976. Up to 200,000 SEAT 133s had been produced by 1979 in Spain.

Noteworthy at that time was the engine's compression ratio of only 8:1, which permitted the car to run on 85 octane petrol/gasoline.  This was still appropriate in Spain, but elsewhere in western Europe even "regular" fuel grades by now generally guaranteed a higher minimum octane rating.

As with the 850, it was a rear-wheel drive, rear-engined car – a layout that was being supplanted by front-engined, front-wheel drive hatchbacks like the Renault 5 and Fiat's own Fiat 127 at the time.
Reflecting the rear engine lay-out, there was just a small well for parcels behind the back seats, with more room for luggage at the front boot.

Export markets 

The SEAT 133 was named as the Fiat 133 in certain export markets where the SEAT brand was unknown. Around 127,000 units were exported, mostly under the Fiat name.

The SEAT 133 was exported to Germany from the autumn/Fall of 1974: there it found some success among rear-wheel-drive loyalists in the mid-seventies. It was also sold in Britain from June 1975. These countries had no SEAT dealership network at the time, and the cars were branded as Fiat 133s, to be marketed alongside the Fiats 126 and 127.

From 1977 to 1980 the Fiat Argentine subsidiary built them, also under the Fiat name. Around 15,821 Fiat 133 were made in the Fiat/Sevel Plant at Córdoba in Argentina between 1977 and 1982.

A sporty version called FIAT 133 T IAVA developed by Industria Argentina de Vehículos de Avanzada (IAVA) was made between 1979 - 1980.

In April 1977, it was announced that Egypt was about to become the world's 32nd car-producing country. This followed the signing of an agreement for the shipment of CKD kits from Seat's Barcelona plant to the Helwan premises of the Nasr Automotive Manufacturing Company for assembly, in order to supply the Egyptian market and for export to Iraq.

Motorsport 
The 133 is popular in the Finnish low-budget motorsport called  jokamiesluokka, a local folk racing series, where over 30 percent of the drivers chose to drive Fiat 133s at one point.

Technical data

References 

133
Rear-engined vehicles
1980s cars
Cars of Spain
Cars introduced in 1974